The White Ash Mine disaster occurred on 9 September 1889 at the White Ash Mine, an underground coal mine in Golden, Colorado. Ten men who had been working at the end of the lowest level were killed when the mine was accidentally flooded. Their bodies were never recovered and the mine was abandoned. It is likely that the flood was caused by a fire that weakened a barrier between the White Ash Mine and a nearby abandoned mine that was known to be flooded.

Background
The White Ash Mine, which opened in 1862, became one of the most extensive early coal mines in Colorado. It produced coal for use in Golden, in Denver to the east, and at gold and silver mines in the Rocky Mountains to the west. A vertical shaft was sunk in rock west of the seam, and horizontal cross-cuts were driven from the shaft to reach the seam, after which horizontal levels were driven within the coal itself. By the end of 1880, the mine employed forty men and was producing about 100 short tons (91 tonnes) of coal per day.

The Loveland Mine, which lay a short distance to the north, had worked the same coal seam. By the time of the disaster it had been abandoned and was known to be filled with water.

Flooding
At about 4:00 in the afternoon on 9 September 1889 the White Ash Mine was accidentally flooded from the abandoned Loveland Mine. The engineer realized that there was a problem when he tried to send the cage down the shaft but it didn't reach the bottom and none of his signals were answered. When he attempted to raise the cage he found that it was stuck. The foreman climbed down a ladder to the 280 Foot Level where he "heard a great roaring, and knew that the mine was flooded". He then hurried to the Loveland Mine and saw that the water was gone.

The foreman again attempted to enter the White Ash Mine but was turned back by gas. Air was pumped into the mine throughout the night, but by morning the men were presumed to have been drowned beneath  of water. It was not possible to recover the bodies because the volume of water in the mine exceeded the capacity of the available pumps.

Cause
According to the State Inspector of Coal Mines, the 280 Foot Level of the White Ash Mine had previously been on fire. It was likely, however, that the fire had continued to eat away at the wall until it failed.

"One of the upper levels of the White Ash, which if protracted would have made connection with the lowest seam in the Loveland, has for a long time been on fire, and it is supposed that this at last burned through into the Loveland, letting in the water, which ran down the White Ash shaft and drowned the men working in the levels below."

The Inspector noted that a mine dump on the surface was also on fire and, alternatively, that fire might have worked its way down into the barrier.

Aftermath
The White Ash Mine was abandoned after the flood and the bodies of the ten miners were never recovered. They are commemorated by a bronze statue in the Mines Museum of Earth Science, shown at right above, and by an information plaque placed near the site of the shaft at the west end of 12th Street in Golden by the Colorado School of Mines. An older bronze plaque at the site, shown at left, reads as follows:

References

1889 in Colorado
1889 mining disasters
Coal mining disasters in Colorado